Mohamed Amine Ihattaren (Riffian-Berber: ⵎⵓⵃⴰⵎⴻⴷ ⵉⵃⴰⵜⴰⵔⵏ, born 12 February 2002) is a Dutch professional footballer who plays as a midfielder for Serie A club Juventus.

Early life
Ihattaren was born in Utrecht and grew up in the Kanaleneiland district with around 16,000 inhabitants, mainly with Moroccan background. Many international footballers are also from there, including Ibrahim Afellay and Ismaïl Aissati. Possessing Dutch and Moroccan passports, he was born to Moroccan parents. He has four brothers and a sister. His father, Mostapha Ihattaren (died in October 2019), arrived in Utrecht in the 1980s from Rouadi close to Al Hoceima, a city located in the Rif region of northern Morocco. Ihattaren was enrolled by his father at the local football club SV Houten club in Utrecht in 2009.

Under the coaching of Henry Vermeulen, he appeared in all matches during his year at SV Houten. Vermeulen stated in 2018: "His ball handling, his dribbling and his vision were impressive. He was nicknamed "Ibi" due to his playing style resembling that of Ibrahim Afellay".

Club career

PSV Eindhoven

2018–19 season 
A youth product of PSV Eindhoven since 2010, Ihattaren signed his first professional contract with PSV on 28 March 2018. Ihattaren made his professional debut for PSV in a 2–1 Eredivisie win over FC Groningen on 26 January 2019, coming on as a late substitute for Gastón Pereiro. He became the fourth-youngest player to make his debut for PSV, behind Stanley Bish, Wilfred Bouma and Willy Janssen. 

Ihattaren made four appearances for the first team before making his debut for reserve team Jong PSV in the second-tier Eerste Divisie on 22 February 2019, in a 2–2 home draw against Roda JC Kerkrade. In that game, he scored his first senior goal.

Ihattaren had made eight appearances for the first team when head coach Mark van Bommel definitively promoted him to the first-team squad in March 2019. There, he went on to compete for a spot as an attacking midfielder with Gastón Pereiro and Érick Gutiérrez.

2019–20 season 
Ihattaren scored his first goal for PSV's first team on 18 August 2019, netting to close the game with a 2–0 final score Heracles Almelo. His first European goal followed four days after, when he scored the opener in a 3–0 win in the UEFA Europa League qualifier against Apollon Limassol.

Ihattaren scored his second goal in the Eredivisie on 7 December 2019, in a 5–0 win over Fortuna Sittard. He scored from a penalty in the 52nd minute and dedicated the goal to his father, who had died two months earlier. By scoring the penalty, Ihattaren became the youngest player ever to score on a penalty-kick in the Eredivisie (17 years and 298 days). He broke the record of Ronald Koeman, who was 17 years and 325 days at the time of his first successful penalty-kick. Ihattaren became a starter in the first team of PSV during the 2019–20 season.

2020–21 season 
In the first half of the 2020–21 season, Ihattaren lost his place in the starting lineup under new head coach Roger Schmidt. Only in December 2020, he emerged from his slump of form. In February 2021, however, tensions broke out again between Schmidt and Ihattaren, and the latter's attitude was questioned.

On 31 July 2021, Ihattaren was axed from the squad for disciplinary reasons as he was officially absent from practice with PSV due to illness. Instead, he was spotted at the Nice training ground together with his agent Mino Raiola.

Juventus 
On 31 August 2021, Ihattaren joined Serie A side Juventus, signing a four-year contract.

Loan to Sampdoria
After signing with Juventus, he was promptly loaned to fellow-Serie A club Sampdoria on a one-year deal. On 12 September, Ihattaren made his first bench appearance in a 2–2 draw against Inter Milan, without making his debut. In October 2021 – only a month and a half after his arrival – Ihattaren had still not made his debut for the club, and reports of 'adaptation issues' arose, despite Ihattaren having been assigned a personal assistant in Italy to support him with practical matters, in addition to his own manager José Fortes Rodríguez, the man who has been guiding him on behalf of his agent Mino Raiola for several years. Allegedly, Sampdoria were fed up with his behaviour and lack of professionalism. He had practiced individually for a long time to regain his fitness in Genoa, but regularly visited acquaintances in Monaco and Milan, cities about two and a half hours drive from Genoa. He returned to the Netherlands for "personal reasons" on 14 October 2021. Ihattaren ended his experience at Sampdoria with only one bench appearance and he was never fielded onto the pitch.

Loan to Ajax
On 12 January 2022 it was reported that Ihattaren was working on his fitness with Gerald Vanenburg in order to facilitate a re-entry into professional football. Initial reports speculated a return to his hometown club FC Utrecht. On 30 January it was confirmed that Ajax had loaned him from Juventus for one year with an option to buy set at €2 million. On 11 March, after still having not made his debut for the club, manager Erik ten Hag expressed his disappointment with Ihattaren's physical improvement in recent weeks: "If you can't run, it ends there".

On 1 April, Ihattaren first appeared for Jong Ajax, AFC Ajax's youth team competing in the Eerste Divisie league, in a 0–0 draw against NAC Breda, which marked his first competitive game in almost a year. Three days later, Ihattaren played his first game with Jong Ajax as a starter and scored a goal against TOP Oss, helping his side win 4–1. On 17 April, Ihattaren debuted for the first team during the 2022 KNVB Cup Final loss against PSV, his former team, coming on as a substitute in the 86th minute. On 25 April, he scored an hat-trick in ten minutes in Jong Ajax's 6–1 win against VVV-Venlo.

On 31 October 2022, Ajax notified Juventus of their intention not to exercise the purchase option on Ihattaren's contract, his loan being set to expire on 3 January 2023.

International career
Born in Utrecht, Netherlands, Ihattaren is a youth international for the Netherlands, and was a member of the Netherlands U17s who won the 2018 UEFA European Under-17 Championship. In November 2019 he committed his international future to  the Netherlands national team. Ihattaren was called up to the senior Netherlands squad for the UEFA Nations League matches against Poland and Italy in September 2020.

Style of play
A quick and skilful midfielder, Ihattaren is mainly as a playmaker but can play most attacking positions. Instinctive and skilled in passing, he has been compared to fellow countryman Memphis Depay.

Controversy
In 2022, Ihattaren came under fire for his alleged ties and connections to the Dutch criminal underworld: he was accused of having ties to the Mocro Maffia (a powerful criminal organization made up of criminals who are Moroccan or of Moroccan descent), after one of the alleged members of the organization (who is on trial in connection with the notorious Marengo trial) arrived at the courthouse in a car belonging to Ihattaren, which led Dutch authorities to investigate and discover that Ihattaren is a friend and associate of some high-ranking members of this powerful criminal group. According to journalist John van den Heuvel of De Telegraaf, Ihattaren had also dated a girl who was related to a family tied to the Mocro Maffia. Because of all this controversy, he began to receive death threats on social media, and Ajax, his team at the time, tried to terminate his contract before the end of the 2022–23 Eredivisie season, the first division of the football in the Netherlands.

On 12 February 2023, Ihattaren was arrested in Amsterdam after being charged for domestic abuse to his girlfriend. He was released two days later, while still being investigated as a suspect.

Career statistics

Honours
Netherlands U17
 UEFA European Under-17 Championship: 2018
Individual
 UEFA European Under-17 Championship Team of the Tournament: 2018

References

External links

 
 
 
 Ons Oranje U15
 Ons Oranje U16
 Ons Oranje U19

2002 births
Living people
Footballers from Utrecht (city)
Dutch footballers
Netherlands youth international footballers
Dutch sportspeople of Moroccan descent
Association football midfielders
PSV Eindhoven players
Jong PSV players
Juventus F.C. players
U.C. Sampdoria players
Jong Ajax players
AFC Ajax players
Eredivisie players
Eerste Divisie players
Dutch expatriate footballers
Dutch expatriate sportspeople in Italy
Expatriate footballers in Italy